Emmanuel Auguste Irénée Véry-Hermence (31 March 1904 in Sainte-Marie, Martinique – 19 June 1966 in Paris) was a socialist politician from Martinique who was elected to the French National Assembly in 1946.

References 

 page on the French National Assembly website VÉRY (Emmanuel, Auguste, Irénée, dit Hermence)

1904 births
1966 deaths
People from Sainte-Marie, Martinique
Martiniquais politicians
French Section of the Workers' International politicians
Deputies of the 1st National Assembly of the French Fourth Republic
Deputies of the 2nd National Assembly of the French Fourth Republic
Deputies of the 3rd National Assembly of the French Fourth Republic
Deputies of the 1st National Assembly of the French Fifth Republic
Deputies of the 2nd National Assembly of the French Fifth Republic